Code 11 is a barcode symbology developed by Intermec in 1977. It is used primarily in telecommunications. The symbol can encode any length string consisting of the digits 0–9 and the dash character (-).  A twelfth code represents the start/stop character, commonly printed as "*". One or two modulo-11 check digit(s) can be included.

It is a discrete, binary symbology where each digit consists of three bars and two spaces; a single narrow space separates consecutive symbols.  The width of a digit is not fixed; three digits (0, 9 and -) have one wide element, while the others have two wide elements.

The valid codes have one wide bar, and may have one additional wide element (bar or space).

The decode table has 15 entries because the symbols with two wide bars (1, 4 and 5) are listed twice.

Assuming narrow elements are one unit wide and wide elements are two units, the average digit is 7.8 units.  This is better than codes with a larger repertoire like Codabar (10 units) or Code 39 (11 units), but not quite as good as interleaved 2 of 5 (7 units).  The non-binary symbology Code 128 uses 5.5 units per digit (11 units per digit pair).

External links 
Code 11 Symbology Specification 

Barcodes